In mathematics, specifically in group theory, the Prüfer p-group or the p-quasicyclic group or p∞-group, Z(p∞), for a prime number p is the unique p-group in which every element has p different p-th roots. 

The Prüfer p-groups are countable abelian groups that are important in the classification of infinite abelian groups: they (along with the group of rational numbers) form the smallest building blocks of all divisible groups.

The groups are named after Heinz Prüfer, a German mathematician of the early 20th century.

Constructions of Z(p∞)
The Prüfer p-group may be identified with the subgroup of the circle group, U(1), consisting of all pn-th roots of unity as n ranges over all non-negative integers:

The group operation here is the multiplication of complex numbers.

There is a presentation

Here, the group operation in Z(p∞) is written as multiplication. 

Alternatively and equivalently, the Prüfer p-group may be defined as the Sylow p-subgroup of the quotient group Q/Z, consisting of those elements whose order is a power of p:

(where Z[1/p] denotes the group of all rational numbers whose denominator is a power of p, using addition of rational numbers as group operation). 

For each natural number n, consider the quotient group Z/pnZ and the embedding Z/pnZ → Z/pn+1Z induced by multiplication by p. The direct limit of this system is Z(p∞):

We can also write

where Qp denotes the additive group of p-adic numbers and Zp is the subgroup of p-adic integers.

Properties
The complete list of subgroups of the Prüfer p-group  Z(p∞) = Z[1/p]/Z is:

(Here  is a cyclic subgroup of Z(p∞) with pn elements; it contains precisely those elements of Z(p∞) whose order divides pn and corresponds to the set of pn-th roots of unity.) The Prüfer p-groups are the only infinite groups whose subgroups are totally ordered by inclusion. This sequence of inclusions expresses the Prüfer p-group as the direct limit of its finite subgroups. As there is no maximal subgroup of a Prüfer p-group, it is its own Frattini subgroup.

Given this list of subgroups, it is clear that the Prüfer p-groups are indecomposable (cannot be written as a direct sum of proper subgroups). More is true: the Prüfer p-groups are subdirectly irreducible. An abelian group is subdirectly irreducible if and only if it is isomorphic to a finite cyclic p-group or to a Prüfer group.

The Prüfer p-group is the unique infinite p-group that is locally cyclic (every finite set of elements generates a cyclic group). As seen above, all proper subgroups of Z(p∞) are finite. The Prüfer p-groups are the only infinite abelian groups with this property. 

The Prüfer p-groups are divisible. They play an important role in the classification of divisible groups; along with the rational numbers they are the simplest divisible groups. More precisely: an abelian group is divisible if and only if it is the direct sum of a (possibly infinite) number of copies of Q and (possibly infinite) numbers of copies of Z(p∞) for every prime p. The (cardinal) numbers of copies of Q and Z(p∞) that are used in this direct sum determine the divisible group up to isomorphism.

As an abelian group (that is, as a Z-module), Z(p∞) is Artinian but not Noetherian. It can thus be used as a counterexample against the idea that every Artinian module is Noetherian (whereas every Artinian ring is Noetherian).

The endomorphism ring of Z(p∞) is isomorphic to the ring of p-adic integers Zp.

In the theory of locally compact topological groups the Prüfer p-group (endowed with the discrete topology) is the Pontryagin dual of the compact group of p-adic integers, and the group of p-adic integers is the Pontryagin dual of the Prüfer p-group.

See also
 p-adic integers, which can be defined as the inverse limit of the finite subgroups of the Prüfer p-group.
 Dyadic rational, rational numbers of the form a/2b. The Prüfer 2-group can be viewed as the dyadic rationals modulo 1.
Cyclic group (finite analogue)
Circle group (uncountably infinite analogue)

Notes

References
 
 
 
 

Abelian group theory
Infinite group theory
P-groups